The Centennial Light is the world's longest-lasting light bulb, burning since 1901, and almost never turned off. It is located at 4550 East Avenue, Livermore, California, and  maintained by the Livermore-Pleasanton Fire Department. Due to its longevity, the bulb has been noted by The Guinness Book of World Records, Ripley's Believe It or Not!, and General Electric.

History 
The Centennial Light was originally a 30-watt (or 60-watt) bulb, but is now very dim, emitting about the same light as a 4-watt nightlight. The hand-blown, carbon-filament common light bulb was invented by Adolphe Chaillet, a French engineer who filed a patent for this technology. It was manufactured in Shelby, Ohio, by the Shelby Electric Company in the late 1890s; many just like it still exist and can be found functioning. According to Zylpha Bernal Beck, the bulb was donated to the Fire Department by her father, Dennis Bernal, in 1901. Bernal owned the Livermore Power and Water Company and donated the bulb to the fire station when he sold the company. That story has been supported by firefighter volunteers of that era.

Evidence suggests that the bulb has hung in at least four locations. It was originally hung in 1901 in a hose cart house on L Street, then moved to a garage in downtown Livermore used by the fire and police departments. When the fire department consolidated, it was moved again to a newly constructed City Hall that housed the unified department.

Its unusual longevity was first noticed in 1972 by reporter Mike Dunstan. After weeks of interviewing people who had lived in Livermore all their lives, he wrote "Light Bulb May Be World's Oldest", published in the Tri-Valley Herald. Dunstan contacted the Guinness Book of World Records, Ripley's Believe It or Not, and General Electric, who all confirmed it as the longest-lasting bulb known in existence. The article came to the attention of Charles Kuralt of the CBS-TV program On the Road with Charles Kuralt.

Retired Deputy Fire Chief Tom Bramell wrote a history of the bulb.  It is titled "A Million Hours of Service".

In 1976, the fire department moved to Fire Station #6 with the bulb; the bulb socket's cord was severed for fear that unscrewing the bulb could damage it. It was deprived of electricity for only 22 minutes during the transfer, which was made in a specially designed box and with full firetruck escort. An electrician was on hand to install the bulb into the new fire station's emergency generator. Ripley's Believe It Or Not stated that the short delay would not mar the bulb's continuous burning record. Since that move, the bulb has run continuously on an uninterruptible power supply; previously it had only been off the grid for short periods of time (e.g. a week in 1937 for a renovation and the odd power outage). In 2001, the bulb's 100th birthday was celebrated with a community barbecue and live music.

On the evening of May 20, 2013, the general public witnessed, through a dedicated webcam, that the bulb had apparently burned out. The next morning, an electrician was called in to confirm its status. It was determined that the bulb had not burned out when the dedicated power supply was bypassed, using an extension cord. The power supply was found to have been faulty. Approximately 9 hours and 45 minutes had passed before the light was reestablished.

The bulb is cared for by the Centennial Light Bulb Committee, a partnership of the Livermore-Pleasanton Fire Department, Livermore Heritage Guild, Lawrence Livermore National Laboratories, and Sandia National Laboratories. The Livermore-Pleasanton Fire Department plans to house and maintain the bulb for the rest of its life, regardless of length.  When it does go out, they have no plans for it, although Ripley's Believe it or Not! has requested it for their museum.

Publicity 
The bulb was officially listed in the Guinness Book of World Records as "the most durable light" in 1972, replacing another bulb in Fort Worth, Texas. The bulb was listed in the book for the next 16 editions. It was not listed during 1988–2006, without a reason being given, before returning in 2007.

According to the fire chief, every few months a news outlet will publish a story on the bulb, generating visitors and general interest, then it will drop back into obscurity for a while. Dozens of magazines and newspapers have featured articles on the bulb. The bulb has been visited and featured by many major news channels in the United States, including NBC, ABC, Fox, CBS, WB, CNN and NPR. The bulb has received letters acknowledging and celebrating its longevity from the city of Shelby, Ohio, the Alameda County Board of Supervisors, the California State Assembly, the California State Senate, Congresswoman Ellen Tauscher, Senator Barbara Boxer, and President George W. Bush. The bulb was featured on an episode of MythBusters on December 13, 2006, in the PBS documentary Livermore and an episode of California's Gold with Huell Howser, in an episode of 99% Invisible, in the web series 17776, and by documentary filmmaker Roberto Serrini in the web series TravelClast.

See also

Adolphe Alexandre Chaillet
Eternal flame
Longest-lasting light bulbs
Phoebus cartel

References

External links 

Official website for the bulb

Individual lamps
Livermore, California
1901 establishments in California